Maîtresses couturières was a French guild organisation for seamstresses within the city of Paris, active from 30 March 1675 until 1791. It was one of only three guilds open to women in Paris prior to 1776, the other two being the Maitresses bouquetieres and the Maîtresses marchandes lingères.

They had permission to manufacture clothes for women and children, with the exception of the most expensive court dress for women. This placed them in competition with the tailors' guild, who had permission to manufacture clothes for both men and women. 

The guild was somewhat unusual: though the occupation of seamstress was very common and socially accepted for a woman, it was normally practiced outside of the guilds in Europe prior to the 19th century, and discriminated against by the tailors' guilds. Paris was rare in having an actual guild for seamstresses, and it was further increased with the Marchandes de modes of 1776.

References

Sources 
 
 

Guilds in France
Women in France
Historical legal occupations
History of Paris
1791 disestablishments in France
History of fashion
1675 establishments in France
Fashion occupations
17th-century fashion
French businesspeople in fashion
17th-century French businesspeople
18th-century French businesspeople
1675 in France